Natalie Ni Shi (born 9 May 1983) is a Canadian lyric operatic soprano and film actress. She has received critical acclaim since her debut as Queen of the Night in The Magic Flute.

Shi has performed in cities like Vancouver, Beijing, Hong Kong, New York, Rome and Vienna.

Early life and career
Shi was born to a Chinese family in Canada before moving back to China with her parents. Her mother was the cousin of famous Chinese philosopher Ai Siqi, and her father's ancestor was a Qing Dynasty imperial doctor.

When she was 9, Shi participated in an NHK television documentary about the 100th anniversary of the China-Vietnam railway, which sparked a love of performing.

At the age of 13, she left her parents to move to the UK, where she studied at the Sherborne College and Hurtwood House. Her love of opera and musicals began during a school trip to watch Cat. After participating in several school musicals, Shi returned to Vancouver and graduated from University of British Columbia, where she majored in Opera Performance and minored in Commerce. In her final year, the opera artist program Opera Nuova cast her in Queen of the Night.

Shortly after graduating, she moved to Rome to study with Rolando Nicolosi (Luciano Pavarotti's pianist and coach). In 2010, Shi was invited to perform in Vienna's Golden Hall, and later studied with language coach Nico Castel at the Juilliard School of Musi, where James Lvyone offered her the main role in his newly composed Chinese opera. Shi realised the importance of mastering the language and started to notice more aesthetic differences between Chinese and Western music styles, which inspired her to complete her master's degree at the Central Conservatory of Music in Beijing.

In 2015, Shi joined IEMR Resources Inc. (CVE:IRI) as one of main five Directors.

Honors and awards
Shi performed the Canadian national anthem for Canadian citizenship ceremonies, receiving compliments from Senate Mobina Jaffer and judges. In both 2013 and 2014, ambassador Mr/ Guy Saint-Jacques invited her to sing the Canadian national anthem at the National Day of Canada celebrations in Beijing.

Shi has won many awards and competitions, including the 40th XL Vincenzo Bellini International Voice Competition in 2008.

In 2014, she was invited to be the judge of Miss Chinese Cosmos Pageant Americas Region.

Academia 
Shi created a seven-series analysis of Le nozze di Figaro, which was broadcast on China National Radio.  Her work on A Midsummer Night's Dream was published in CNKI. China Central Television broadcast her performances at the Yunnan 8 Universities Academia Concert.

Philanthropy

Shi founded the North America Foundation for Arts and Minorities in 2008, with the aim of helping people suffering from poverty, natural disasters and sickness. She has since held several benefit concerts in China and Canada for disaster relief, such as for the 2008 Sichuan earthquake or for projects in Burma in 2018. She also held the "Classical Enlightenment" performance in 2016, which raised money for an Alzheimer's Disease charity.

Discography
 2004: Beauty Lies Within
 2009: Keep it up

Repertoire

Filmography

Competitions and awards
 International Artists music competition 2009 (Winner)
 40th XL Vincenzo Bellini International Voice Competition, Italy 2008 (Winner)
 Voice Division, Richmond Music Festival, Vancouver, 2006 (Winner)
 Kiwanis Vancouver Music Festival, Vancouver, 2006 (First place)
 International Chinese Vocal Competition, New York City, 2007 (Semi-finalist)
 Reigate & Regill music Festival, London, England, 1999 (Honorary award)

Scholarships 
 Canadian Millennium Scholarship 2006
 British Columbia Scholarship for academic incline in undergraduate study 2008
 Opera Nuova 2008
 2007 Beijing Outstanding International Student Scholarship 2012

References

External links
 
 Interview with Natalie Ni Shi on Phoenix North America Chinese Channel, 27 August 2014

1983 births
Living people
Place of birth missing (living people)
Canadian operatic sopranos
University of British Columbia alumni
Central Conservatory of Music alumni
Musicians from Vancouver
21st-century Canadian women singers